The Fairfax County Fire and Rescue Department is a combination career and volunteer organization that provides fire suppression services, emergency medical response services, technical rescue services, hazardous materials Response services, water rescue services, life safety education, fire prevention and arson investigation services to Fairfax County, Virginia. Emergency medical services include advanced life support response by ALS (Advanced Life Support) capable engines and transport units.

Metropolitan Washington Council of Governments

As part of the Metropolitan Washington Council of Governments, Fairfax County Fire and Rescue is labeled number 4 in the 800 MHz trunked radio system. All FCFR units begin with 4 followed by the station number. For example, the engine from station 19 is E419M, and the tower-ladder from station 1 is TL401M. During an emergency that would require a response from multiple agencies, dispatchers are quickly able to identify what county a particular piece of apparatus came from. The "M" at the end of the unit designation represents an ALS capable unit (paramedic on board,) which all Fairfax County Engines, Trucks, Towers, and Rescues have.

Overview 

FCFRD consists of 42 fire stations spread out across the county's , serving a population of 1.15 million residents.  With over 1,400 uniformed staff, 300 civilian employees, and 350 operational and administrative volunteers, the Fairfax County Fire and Rescue Department is the largest fire department in the Commonwealth of Virginia.

The Fairfax County Volunteer Fire and Rescue Association (FCVFRA) partners with the FCFRD to combine 12 volunteer fire and rescue departments in Fairfax County.  Volunteers in these 12 departments are full partners with the career staff of the Fairfax County Fire and Rescue Department, providing emergency services in and around Fairfax County. These volunteers are trained to the same standards as career personnel and are involved in all aspects of the fire and rescue services from staffing ambulances and fire suppression vehicles to participating in domestic and international urban search and rescue. As independent, nonprofit organizations, the volunteer departments own 8 of the 42 fire stations in Fairfax County and operate out of an additional 7 fire stations. Over 355 volunteer personnel placed units in service on 1,877 occasions, out of a total of 103,946 incidents countywide for FY2018.

USAR Task Force 

Fairfax County Fire and Rescue also sponsors one of the nation's Urban Search and Rescue response teams. Named 'Virginia Task Force 1,' the team is composed of approximately 200 specially trained career and volunteer fire and rescue personnel, with expertise in the rescue of victims from collapsed structures, following a natural or man-made catastrophic event. The team is composed of emergency managers and planners, physicians and paramedics and includes specialists in the fields of structural engineering, heavy rigging, collapse rescue, logistics, hazardous materials, communications, canine operations, and technical search.  Virginia Task Force 1 has partnerships with the Department of Homeland Security/Federal Emergency Management Agency for domestic response and the United States Agency for International Development/Office of U.S. Foreign Disaster Assistance during international missions. As a part of the Fairfax County Fire and Rescue Department, the task force maintains constant operational readiness as a local resource for residents of Fairfax County and surrounding jurisdictions.

Stations and apparatus 
● Almost all apparatus are considered career-staffed unless where marked by a 'V'. 
● Accounts for the addition of the 8th Battalion in February 2021. 
● Station 44 (Scotts Run) in McLean opened, and Rescue 401 became Rescue 444, both in August 2021.

● Accounts for the ALS to BLS conversion of certain career transport units (Annandale (8), Bailey's Crossroads (10), Great Falls (12), Chantilly (15), Clifton (16), Gunston (20), Reston (25), West Springfield (27), Fox Mill (31), Fairfax Center (40), Crosspointe (41), and Scott's Run (44)) in February 2022.

Abbreviations:

Gallery

References

External links
 Fairfax County Fire and Rescue homepage
 FCFRD Station list
 Department Patches
 Fairfax County Volunteer Fire Rescue Association
 Fairfax County Professional Fire Fighters & Paramedics - IAFF Local 2068

Government in Fairfax County, Virginia
Fire departments in Virginia
1949 establishments in Virginia
Government agencies established in 1949